François-Louis Crosnier (12 May 1792 - 1 September 1867) was a French theatre manager, politician, and playwright, who used the pen name Edmond Crosnier.

Biography 

Born François-Louis Croisnu, he was the son of Louis Croisnu, who adopted the name Crosnier, and Marie-Barbe Constantin, concierges of the Opera, who kept the post for over 35 years. François-Louis first married Françoise-Charlotte-Félix Berville Vallouy and in second nuptials, Marie-Joséphine Alcasar, who was the widow of Casimir-Anne-Marie Broussais, the son of François Broussais.

Early in life he became a playwright, whose plays were performed on the most important Parisian stages of the 19th century, including the Théâtre de la Porte-Saint-Martin, the Théâtre de la Gaîté, the Théâtre de l'Odéon, and the Théâtre de l'Ambigu-Comique. However, failing to achieve great success and acquiring a large fortune through marriage, he abandoned playwriting for other endeavours.

He was very successful managing the Opéra-Comique, a theatre in full-blown financial crisis when he took over in 1834. He brought the theatre back to prosperity by staging a large number of successful works, among the most remarkable being Lestocq and Le cheval de bronze by Daniel Auber, L'éclair by Fromental Halévy, Les chaperons blancs by Auber, Sarah by Albert Grisar, the Le postillon de Lonjumeau by Adolphe Adam, L'ambassadrice and Le domino noir by Auber, Le brasseur de Preston by Adam, La fille du régiment by Gaetano Donizetti, and Zanetta, Les diamants de la couronne, Le duc d'Olonne, and La sirène by Auber.

He died at Lisle, in the château de l'Épau, near Vendôme, the town where he was mayor, on 1 September 1867 (acte n° 4, vue 442/469 du registre) and is buried in the Montmartre Cemetery in a chapel of the 15th division, where he lies alongside his father and his two spouses.

Works 
1816 : Le Huit juillet, ou Trois fêtes pour une, vaudeville in 1 act
1817 : La Pièce en perce, comedy in 1 act, mixed with vaudevilles, with Armand Croizette
1820 : Paris, le 29 septembre 1820, impromptu mixed with couplets, with Desprez
1820 : La pièce d'emprunt ou le compilateur, comedy in 1 act, mixed with vaudevilles, with Amable de Saint-Hilaire
1821 : Les Ermites, comédie-vaudeville in 1 act, with Michel-Nicolas Balisson de Rougemont and Aimé Desprez
1821 : Jocrisse paria, tragédie burlesque in 1 act in verses, with Amable de Saint-Hilaire
1822 : Le Meurtrier, ou le Dévouement filial, hidtorical melodrama in 3 acts, à spectacle, with Amable de Saint-Hilaire
1823 : Le Contrebandier, melodrama in 3 acts à spectacle
1823 : Le Mariage à la turque, vaudeville in 1 act, with Desprez
1823 : L'École du scandale, play in 3 acts and in prose, imitée de Sheridan, with de La Salle
1824 : Le Mauvais sujet, comedy in 1 act, mixed with couplets, with Dupetit-Méré
1824 : Minuit, ou la Révélation, melodrame in 3 acts, à show, with Dupetit-Méré
1825 : La fille du musicien, drama in three acts, with Alexandre de Ferrière
1825 : Le Canal Saint-Martin, vaudeville in 1 act, with de La Salle
1825 : Le Voyage à Reims, vaudeville in 2 tableaux, with de la Salle
1825 : L'Étrangère, melodrama in 3 acts, with Frédéric Dupetit-Méré
1826 : Le Caissier, drama in 3 acts, with Armand-François Jouslin de La Salle
1826 : La Fête du village, ou le Cadran de la commune, vaudeville in 1 act, with de la Salle
1826 : Le Contumace, melodrama in 3 acts, à spectacle, with de La Salle
1827 : Louise, drama in 3 acts and in prose, with Dupetit-Méré and Jean-Baptiste Pellissier
1827 : Mandrin, melodrama in 3 acts, with Benjamin Antier and Étienne Arago

Distinction 
 Commandeur of the Légion d'honneur

Notes

Bibliography 
 
  
 
 
 Tamvaco, Jean-Louis (2000). Les Cancans de l'Opéra. Chroniques de l'Académie Royale de Musique et du théâtre, à Paris sous les deux restorations (2 volumes, in French). Paris: CNRS Editions. .

External links 
 Base de données historique sur les anciens députés

1792 births
1867 deaths
People from Versailles
Bonapartists
Members of the 1st Corps législatif of the Second French Empire
Members of the 2nd Corps législatif of the Second French Empire
Members of the 3rd Corps législatif of the Second French Empire
19th-century French dramatists and playwrights
French theatre managers and producers
Directors of the Paris Opera
Commandeurs of the Légion d'honneur
Burials at Montmartre Cemetery